James Lloyd Klein (January 13, 1910 in Saskatoon, Saskatchewan – December 9, 1966) was a Canadian professional ice hockey left winger. He played in the National Hockey League with the Boston Bruins and New York Americans between 1928 and 1937. The rest of his career, which lasted from 1927 to 1948, was mainly spent in the American Hockey League.

Career
Klein played amateur hockey for the Saskatoon Wesleys from the 1924–25 season to the 1926–27 season.

He played 8 seasons in the National Hockey League for the Boston Bruins and New York Americans, winning the Stanley Cup in 1929 with the Boston Bruins.

Klein turned pro playing 21 seasons of pro hockey from the 1927–28 season to the 1947–48 season. He played 164 games in the NHL with 30 goals, 24 assists, 54 points, and 68 penalties in the regular season. He played only 5 playoffs games with no points and 2 penalties. However, most of his 21-year career was played in the minors. His nickname was "Deed".

Career statistics

Regular season and playoffs

References

1910 births
1966 deaths
Boston Bruins players
Boston Cubs players
Boston Tigers (CAHL) players
Buffalo Bisons (AHL) players
Canadian ice hockey right wingers
Cleveland Falcons players
Hershey Bears players
Hollywood Wolves players
Ice hockey people from Saskatchewan
Minneapolis Millers (AHA) players
New York Americans players
New Haven Eagles players
Philadelphia Arrows players
Pittsburgh Hornets players
Place of death missing
Providence Reds players
Saskatoon Sheiks players
Sportspeople from Saskatoon
Syracuse Stars (IHL) players
Tacoma Rockets (WHL) players
Canadian expatriate ice hockey players in the United States